Johanna (Hanna) Sofia Rönnberg (16 April 1862 – 9 October 1946) was a Finnish artist and writer. She belonged to the generation of women painters in the 1880s who adopted the French Realism style, becoming an active member of the Önningeby artists colony on the island of Åland. As an author, she is remembered mainly for her depictions of Scandinavian artists at the end of the 19th century.

Biography
Born on 16 April 1862 in Hämeenlinna, Rönnberg was the daughter of Johan Rönnberg and Evelin Sofie Stenvall. She studied at the Finnish Art Society's Drawing School (1875–81) in Helsinki and at the Royal Swedish Academy of Fine Arts (1881–85) in Stockholm. She went on to attend courses in Paris at the Académie Julian and the Académie Colarossi.

She became particularly attached to the artists colony at Önningeby where the painter Victor Westerholm had a summer house. One of the most important members of the group, she first visited in 1886 and returned year after year. She contributed to the colony's success by including it in her fictional and non-fictional writings. One of the members of the colony was Elin Danielson with whom she painted both in Önningeby and in Paris.

In 1888, Edvard Westman invited her to join him in Denmark. They met in Copenhagen and together visited the Danish artists colony in Skagen. For a time they planned to marry but never did.

Her paintings often included people. Her best works appeared around 1890, some achieving success at exhibitions. Her early works of outdoor scenes on Åland were inspired by the French en plein air movement. She continued to paint in the 1890s and even later, introducing brighter colour and sweeping brushstrokes. In 1932, she arranged a solo exhibition of the paintings.

She became interested in the lives of the inhabitants of the Åland Islands, including them in her fiction and non-fiction writings. From the early 1890s, she concentrated increasingly on her short story collections including Från Ålands skär (1899) and Brovaktens historier (1905) which received a Swedish literature award in 1905. In 1938, she published an account of the artist colony in Konstnärskolonien på Äland 1886–1914.

Hanna Rönnberg spent her later years in a villa on the coast in Kulosaari just outside Helsinki where she died on 9 October 1946.

Works

See also
 Golden Age of Finnish Art
 Finnish art

References

Further reading
 Hanna Rönnberg by Kjell Ekström 

1862 births
1946 deaths
20th-century Finnish women artists
Académie Colarossi alumni
Académie Julian alumni
People from Hämeenlinna
Finnish women short story writers
Finnish short story writers
Finnish women painters